Karolanos, also known as Carolan (Karul·an) or Northern Binukidnon, is a Bisayan language spoken in Kabankalan, Negros Occidental by the Negrense descendants of the indigenous Carolan people.

References

Central Philippine languages
Languages of Negros Occidental